The following list of Khmu (Kammu Yuan dialect of Luang Namtha Province, Laos) animal names is from Svantesson et al. (2013).

Insects

Other arthropods

Other invertebrates

Fish

Amphibians and reptiles

Birds

Mammals

See also
List of Khmu plant common names
Wildlife of Laos

References

Animal common names
Fauna of Laos
Names
Environment of Laos
Animal common names